Radford is a rural locality in the Scenic Rim Region, Queensland, Australia.

Geography
Warrill Creek forms the western and south-western boundaries.

History 
The Fassifern railway line (Queensland's first branch railway line) opened from Ipswich to Harrisville on 10 July 1882. On 12 September 1887 the line was extended to Dugundan with Radford being served by Radford railway station on Radford Road. The line closed in 1964.

The locality takes its name from the railway station, which was named after the town of Radford in Nottinghamshire, England.

Radford State School opened on 3 April 1933 and closed in 1946. It was on Radford Road (approx ).

The locality contained 15 households, in which 46.9% of the population was males and 53.1% of the population was females with a median age of 50, 12 years above the national average. The average weekly household income is $1,624, $186 above the national average.

Education 
There are no schools in Radford. The nearest government primary schools are Warrill View State School in neighbouring Warrill View to the north-west and Harrisville State School in Harrisville to the north-east. The nearest government secondary school is Boonah State High School in Boonah to the south.

References

Further reading 

  — also covers Hillgrove, Milora and Radford Schools

Localities in Queensland
Scenic Rim Region